UDP-N-acetyl-alpha-D-glucosamine hydro-lyase may refer to:
 UDP-N-acetylglucosamine 4,6-dehydratase (configuration-inverting), an enzyme
 UDP-N-acetylglucosamine 4,6-dehydratase (configuration-retaining), an enzyme